This discography of Miki Howard documents the release of studio albums, live recording and compilation albums, well as music videos and singles.

Albums

Studio albums

Live albums

Compilation albums

Singles

Videography

Music videos

References

Notes

External links

Discographies of American artists
Pop music discographies
Rhythm and blues discographies
Soul music discographies